Dick Dlesk Soccer Stadium is a 1,600-capacity soccer specific stadium located in Morgantown, West Virginia where it serves as the home field for the West Virginia Mountaineers men's and women's soccer teams.

Originally called the Mountaineer Soccer Complex, the stadium was completed in August 2004 and is named in honor of University benefactor Dick Dlesk. Dick Dlesk Stadium has hosted the Mountain State Derby twice where WVU holds a 2-0-0 advantage over Marshall.

Top attended games

References

External links
 Information at WVU sports

Soccer venues in West Virginia
Sports venues in West Virginia
West Virginia University campus
Tourist attractions in Monongalia County, West Virginia
Sports venues completed in 2004
2004 establishments in West Virginia